The Home Front Command (Pikud HaOref, also known as PAKAR/HFC) is an Israel Defense Forces mlitary district command, created in February 1992 in response to the lessons of the Gulf War, which was the first war since the 1948 Arab–Israeli War in which centers of civilian population faced significant threat. The command is responsible for civil defense: preparing the civilian population for a conflict or disaster, assisting the population during the crisis, and contributing to post-crisis reconstruction.

Mission 
The mission of the Home Front Command is to strengthen national resilience and save lives. The command does this by preparing the civilian space before a conflict, supporting the civilian space during a conflict while carrying out Search and rescue operations in the event of an attack on the home front, and assisting in the rapid restoration of the civilian space after a conflict has ended. The Home Front Command publishes regular instructions for civil defense, especially in times of emergency, and operates a telephone emergency center numbered 104.

This unit should not be confused with Unit 669. The Home Front Command includes a domestic search and rescue unit, primarily operating in times of natural disasters, while Unit 669 is the Israeli Air Force's Tactical Combat Search and Rescue (CSAR) unit that operates behind enemy lines.

Fields of responsibility 
As of the Home Front Command's website, it's fields of responsibility are: 

 To draft and publish the rulebook of civil defense.
 To prepare and execute plans for civil defense for the entire country and all its territory.
 To train, guide, and operate Magen David Adom in Israel (MDA), the firefighting and rescue services, and the other assistant organizations regarding the fulfilment of their duties in the field of civil defense.
 To guide the population on the home front as well as all officials in the home front theater during attacks or unique situations on the home front as well as issue appropriate instructions.
 To guide local authorities as regards the fulfilment of their duties as regards issues of civil defense.
 To coordinate the activities of government ministries, private factories, national infrastructure, and emergency organizations on issues related to civil defense.
 To draft policies for civil defense for all areas and in coordination with area commands.
 To serve as the competent authority, as defined by law, for the issue of shelter and to serve as an authority, as defined by the Civil Defense Regulations for the matter of dangerous materials.
 To determine the way citizens are alerted, including specifying sirens and all-clear signals, their distribution, and their operation through various methods.
 To construct a system to detect, identify, and decontaminate areas affected by chemical or biological warfare on the home front and to operate that system during incidents of civil defense.
 To store and distribute personal defensive kits to the population in accordance with the regulations in the Civil Defense Regulations (defense kits) 5741-1990 and in accordance with government decisions.
 To operate the necessary powers to execute rescue and lifesaving activities as determined by law.

History

Until the establishment of the Command, responsibility for the Home Front fell under the Civilian Defense's Chief Officer Corps Command and under Regional Defense. During that time, the three regional commands had their own home front commands. After the first Persian Gulf War, these organizations were unified and the Home Front Command was created. It is currently headed by Aluf Rafi Milo

The role of the Homefront command as a civil defense service are embodied in the Israeli civil defense laws of 1951 as well as other government regulations and decisions. Civil defense is defined in law as follows: “The measures taken to defend against any attack, or the danger the attack poses to the civil population, or to minimize the outcome of such an attack to remove weaponry which is not for self-defense.”

Units and districts
The Command is divided into five districts (which are further divided into subdistricts):
 Northern District
 Haifa District
 Dan District
 Jerusalem and Central District
 Southern District

Together the districts field 26 rescue battalions, 13 NBC-defense battalions, 14 military hospitals, 8 light infantry battalions and 6 logistic units manned mostly by reservists. Additionally the active duty "Alon" Brigade fields the following units:

 489th "Kedem"/"East" Search and Rescue Battalion
 498th "Shahar"/"Dawn" Search and Rescue Battalion
 894th "Tavor" Search and Rescue Battalion
 668th "Ram" Search and Rescue Battalion

It also has the search-and-recue training base, Bahad 16.

Notable operations

Albanian earthquake relief assistance

On 26 November 2019, an earthquake struck the Durrës region of Albania, killing 51 people, injuring 3,000 others, and damaging 11,000 buildings. Israel sent Home Front Command military engineer troops and a rescue and service team from the regional council of Mevo'ot HaHermon to Albania to search through the rubble for survivors and rescue them, assess whether buildings were structurally sound, and provide Albanians who had been evacuated from their homes with waterproof tents to shelter them. Israeli Foreign Minister Israel Katz wrote: "We stand with our Albanian friends during this difficult time, and will continue to assist them in any way we can."  On 23 January 2020, Albanian President Ilir Meta met with IDF soldiers during an official visit in Israel, embraced them, and thanked them for their assistance in earthquake relief efforts and "further consolidating the friendly and historical relations between our two nations and our countries." At Ramla military base, Meta awarded the Albanian Golden Medal of the Eagle to the National Rescue Unit of the IDF.

Response to Surfside, Florida, condominium collapse

On June 24, 2021, Israeli Consul-General Maor Elbaz-Starinsky conveyed an official offer from the Israeli government to send the Home Front Command search and rescue team to Florida to assist in rescue efforts associated with the Surfside condominium building collapse. Florida did not respond to the Israeli offer of aid until June 25, when Home Front Command joined the search for survivors. The members of the Home Front Command's  National Rescue Unit who assisted with the rescue efforts ultimately recovered 81 of the 97 victims.

2023 Turkey–Syria earthquake humanitarian aid 

After the 2023 Turkey–Syria earthquake, on the 6th of February, the IDF declared the "Olive Branches" humanitarian aid delegation, a delegation of 150 active duty and reservist personnel of the Home Front command, as well as members of the Israel Fire and Rescue Services, IDF Medical Corps and more, led by Colonel (Aluf-Mishne) Golan Vach. As of 11th of February 2023, the IDF delegation has rescued 19 living civilians, including a 9 years old child.

References

External links
Home Front Command - Official National Emergency Portal

Emergency management in Israel
Military units and formations established in 1992
Regional commands of Israel